Kadina River is a mountain river in the Republic of North Macedonia and right-side tributary of the Vardar. Thence it flows generally eastwards between the Golešnica and Kitka mountains within the Jakupica mountain ranges southeast of the city of Skopje and northwest of the city of Veles. The river empties into the Vardar near Smesnica.

See also
 Geography of North Macedonia

References

Rivers of North Macedonia
Geography of Macedonia (region)
Geography of Skopje